Malamir may refer to:

 Malamir of Bulgaria, a Bulgarian ruler (Khan)
 Malamir, Iran, a city in Khuzestan Province, Iran
 Malamir Knoll, a knoll in Dryanovo Heights, Greenwich Island